Best is a surname. In England the surname is of Anglo-Norman origin meaning the beast (beste). 
People with this surname:

 Adam Best (actor) (born 1983), British actor
 Adolfo "Fito" Best (1891–1964), Mexican painter, film director and screenwriter
 Ahmed Best (born 1973), American voice actor
 Alan Best (filmmaker) (born 1959), Canadian animator
 Alan Best (sculptor) (1910–2001), Canadian sculptor
 Alfred M. Best (1876–1958), American insurance executive
 Alonzo L. Best (1854–1923), American politician
 Andy Best (born 1959),  former British footballer
 Art Best (1953–2014), American football player
 Calum Best (born 1981), TV personality, son of George Best
 Carlisle Best (born 1959), former West Indian cricketer
 Charles Alexander "Sandy" Best (1931–1978), Canadian politician
 Charles Herbert Best (1899–1978), American/Canadian physiologist
 Carrie Best (1903-2001), The first black owner and publisher of a Nova Scotia newspaper
 Clarence Leo Best (1878–1951), founder and chairman of Caterpillar Tractor Company
 Clyde Best (born 1951), former Bermudan footballer
 Daniel Best (1838–1923), founder of Best Manufacturing Company that made tractors and combine harvesting machines
 David Best (footballer) (born 1943), former English footballer
 David Best (politician) (1880–1949), Manitoba politician
 David Best (sculptor) (born 1945), American sculptor
 Denzil Best (1917–1965), American jazz percussionist
 Earl Best (born 1947), American community organizer known as the "Street Doctor"
 Edna Best (1900–1974), British actress
 Eike Best (born 1951), German computer scientist
 Eleanor Best (1875–1958), British artist
 Elsdon Best (1856–1931), New Zealand ethnographer
 Eve Best (born 1971), British stage actress
 George Best (1946–2005), Northern Irish football player
 George Newton Best (1846–1926), American botanist
 Greg Best (born 1964), American equestrian competitor and coach
 Greg Best (American football) (born 1960), American football defensive back
 Harold Best (1937–2020), British Labour Party politician
 James Best (1926–2015), American actor
 Jacob Best, (1786–1861), family patriarch and founder of the Pabst Brewing Company
 Jerry Best (footballer, born 1901) (1901–1975), English footballer
 Jerry Best (bassist) (born 1963), American musician
 Jerry Best (footballer, born 1897) (1897–1955), English footballer
 John Best (bishop) (died 1570), Bishop of Carlisle from 1560 to 1570
 John Best (Canadian politician) (1861–1923), Canadian politician
 John Best (guard captain) (16th century), English Captain of the Yeomen of the Guard
 John Best (soccer) (1940–2014), US/English soccer player
 John William Best (1912–2000), Royal Air Force pilot who was a POW in Colditz Castle during World War II
 Keith Best (born 1949), British Conservative party politician
 Leon Best (born 1986), Irish international footballer
 Marion Best, Canadian church leader
 Marjorie Best (1903–1997), American Hollywood costume designer
 Martin Best (born 1942) musician in ballads and early music
 Mary Ellen Best (1809–1891), artist
 Matthew Best (conductor) (born 1957), English bass and conductor
 Matthew Best (Royal Navy officer) (1878–1940), Royal Navy officer
 Meagan Best (born 2002), Barbadian squash player
Nellie Geraldine Best (1905–1990), American artist, muralist, sculptor
 Nicky Best, British statistician
 Neil Best (born 1979), Irish rugby union international
 Paul Best (cricketer) (born 1991), English cricketer
 Pete Best (born 1941), original drummer for The Beatles
 Peter Best (born 1943), Australian film composer
 Richard Irvine Best (1872–1959), Irish scholar
 Richard Stuart Best (born 1945), member of House of Lords
Richard Halsey Best (1910–2001), US Navy pilot
 Robert Henry Best (1896–1952), convicted of treason in 1948
 Rory Best (born 1982), Irish rugby union international
 S. T. C. Best "Canon Best" (1864–1949), Anglican priest in South Australia
 Sigismund Payne Best (1885–1978), British Secret Intelligence Service agent
 Simon Best (born 1978), Irish rugby union international
 Skeeter Best (1914–1985), American jazz guitarist
Sonja M. Best, Australian-American virologist
 Stephanie Best (born 1969), American track and field athlete
 Steven Best (born 1955), American animal rights activist
 Tino Best (born 1981), West Indian cricketer
 Tommy Best (1920–2018), Welsh footballer
 Travis Best (born 1972), American professional basketball player
 Werner Best (1903–1989), German jurist, police chief and SS–Obergruppenführer
 William Best, 1st Baron Wynford (1767–1845), British politician and judge
 William Thomas Best (1826–1897), English organist and composer

See also
 Beste (disambiguation)
 Bester (disambiguation)
 Bestor

English-language surnames
Surnames of English origin
Surnames from given names